Jonathan Anderson (born October 27, 1991) is a former American football linebacker. He was signed by the Chicago Bears as an undrafted free agent in 2015. He played college football at TCU.

Professional career

Chicago Bears
On May 3, 2015, Anderson signed with the Chicago Bears as an undrafted free agent. On September 5, Anderson was waived but resigned to the practice squad three days later on September 8. He was promoted to the active roster on October 14. Anderson recorded his first career interception against the Detroit Lions on October 18, 2015. Anderson recorded his first career forced fumble against the Tampa Bay Buccaneers on December 27, 2015. At the end of the 2015 season, Anderson recorded 36 tackles, 2 passes defensed, and 1 interception. He and Harold Jones-Quartey became the first pair of undrafted rookies to record interceptions in the same season in Bears history.

Anderson was released by the Bears on September 27, 2016 and was signed to the practice squad the next day. He was promoted back to the active roster on November 23.

On September 2, 2017, Anderson was waived by the Bears and was signed to the practice squad the next day. He was promoted to the active roster on September 12. He was waived by the Bears on October 26, 2017 and was re-signed to the practice squad. He was promoted back to the active roster on November 11, 2017. He was waived on December 9, 2017 and re-signed back to the practice squad. He was promoted back to the active roster on December 20, 2017. He played in 12 games in 2017, recording ten tackles.

On September 1, 2018, Anderson was waived by the Bears. He later landed on the team's injured reserve list, but he was waived on September 24, 2018.

Arizona Cardinals
On December 11, 2018, Anderson was signed by the Arizona Cardinals, but was released a week later.

New York Giants
On January 2, 2019, Anderson signed a reserve/future contract with the New York Giants. He was placed on injured reserve on August 31, 2019. He was released from injured reserve with an injury settlement on September 9.

Personal life 
In December 2014, Anderson got his degree in criminal justice.

References

External links
Chicago Bears bio
TCU Horned Frogs bio

1991 births
Living people
Sportspeople from Corpus Christi, Texas
Players of American football from Texas
American football linebackers
TCU Horned Frogs football players
Chicago Bears players
Arizona Cardinals players
New York Giants players